Duo Live in Concert is a live album by pianist Kenny Drew and bassist Niels-Henning Ørsted Pedersen recorded in the Netherlands in 1974 and released on the SteepleChase label.

Reception
The Allmusic review awarded the album 3 stars.

Track listing
 "In Your Own Sweet Way" (Dave Brubeck) - 9:44  
 "My Little Suede Shoes" (Charlie Parker) - 5:26   
 "You Don't Know What Love Is" (Gene DePaul, Don Raye) - 6:15 Bonus track on CD   
 "My Shining Hour" (Harold Arlen, Johnny Mercer) - 8:45   
 "Viking's Blues" (Niels-Henning Ørsted Pedersen) - 5:50   
 "Oleo" (Sonny Rollins) - 0:36 Bonus track on CD    
 "Do You Know What It Means to Miss New Orleans?" (Louis Alter, Eddie DeLange) - 6:35 Bonus track on CD    
 "Serenity" (Kenny Drew) - 4:27   
 "All Blues" (Miles Davis) - 6:04 Bonus track on CD    
 "Trubbel" (Olle Adolphson) - 5:00   
 "There Is No Greater Love" (Isham Jones, Marty Symes) - 9:21   
 "Oleo" (Rollins) - 2:14

Personnel
Kenny Drew - piano
Niels-Henning Ørsted Pedersen - bass

References

Kenny Drew live albums
Niels-Henning Ørsted Pedersen live albums
1975 live albums
SteepleChase Records live albums